The 2020–21 División de Honor de Hockey Hierba was the 55th season of the División de Honor de Hockey Hierba, the highest men's field hockey league in Spain. The regular season began on 19 September 2020 and is scheduled to finish on 25 April 2021. The play-off semi-finals and final were played on 1 and 2 May 2021 on Atlètic Terrassa.

After last season was suspended due to the COVID-19 pandemic in Spain, this season was played with twelve instead of the regular ten teams. There were no quarter-finals but instead the top four teams qualified directly for the final four.

Club de Campo won their first ever national title by defeating the regular season winners and record champions Atlètic Terrassa 6–3 in the final.

Teams

Number of teams by autonomous community

Regular season

Standings

Results

Top goalscorers

Final 4
The Final 4 was held at the Estadi de Hockey Josep Marquès from Atlètic Terrassa in Terrassa, Catalonia on 1 and 2 May 2021.

Bracket

Semi-finals

Final

Play-outs

Overview

|}

Matches

Jolaseta won series 2–1 and both teams remain in their respective division.

References

División de Honor de Hockey Hierba
Division de Honor de Hockey Hierba
field hockey
field hockey